Ahd Hassan Kamel is an actress and filmmaker from Jeddah, Saudi Arabia. She is known for her role in the BAFTA-nominated film, Wadjda (2014) and for her role as Fatima in BBC Two's Collateral (2018).

Education and early career
Kamel grew up in Saudi Arabia and moved to New York City in 1998. She received a BFA in Animation & Communication from Parsons School of Design in 2004 and a Directing degree from the New York Film Academy in 2005.  Kamel then went on to study acting under the personal tutelage of William Esper at the William Esper Studio.

Kamel has written, directed and acted in her two award-winning short films, The Shoemaker ‘Al-Gondorji’ (2009) and Sanctity ‘Hurma’ (2012).

The themes of these films explore women issues in Saudi Arabia. As Hurma explores a widowed woman's attempts to save her unborn baby with limited means. The film was a selection of the Berlin International Film Festival.

As of 2022, Kamel will be shooting her feature film ‘My Driver & I’ which is a period film set in the 80s about a Saudi woman's relationship with her Sudanese driver. Kamel mentioned the film is based on her experience of living in Jeddah when women could not drive. The film will feature an Arab cast: Jordanian actress Saba Mubarak, Qusai (musician), Mostafa Shahata, and Baraa Alem (star of Shams Al-Ma'arif (film)). The film is funded by OSN, Red Sea Film Festival Foundation.

Filmography
CINEMA

TELEVISION

Awards and nominations
 NOMINATED – Muhr Arab Award (The Shoemaker), Dubai International Film Festival, 2009
 WINNER - GOLDEN ALEPH for Best Short (The Shoemaker), Beirut International Film Festival, 2010
 WINNER – 2nd Prize, (The Shoemaker), Gulf Film Festival, Dubai, 2010
 WINNER - JURY AWARD (The Shoemaker), Oran Film Festival, Oran, Algeria 2010
 WINNER - Development Award (Sanctity) Doha Tribeca Film Festival, 2012
 NOMINATED – Golden Bear for Best Short (Sanctity) Berlinale 2013
 WINNER – 2nd Prize (Sanctity), Gulf Film Festival, Dubai, 2013

Festival selections
The Shoemaker
 2010 Clermont Ferrand Short Film Festival /France
 2010 Brussels Short Film Festival
 2010 Women in Film/Canada 
 2010 Festival Amal/Spain 
 2010 Abu Dhabi International Film Festival
 2010 Arab Film Festival, San Francisco
 2010 Women in Film, Seattle
 2010 International Film Festival Bratislava/Slovak Republic 
 2010 Ljubljana International Film Festival 
 2010 Berlin Interfilm International Short Film Festival
 2010 Kettupäivät Short Film Festival, Helsinki 
 2010 Karama Human Rights Film Festival, Amman

Sanctity
 2013 Sarajevo Film Festival Shorts Program
 2013 Berlinale Shorts Program

References

External links

 
 Ahd Kamel on Vimeo
 Variety: Saudi Actress Ahd Kamel Segues From Role In Front Of The Camera To Behind It
 Huffington Post: Actress & Filmmaker Ahd: The “Exceptional Arab Women in Film” Series
 This Saudi actress will star in a new Netflix series
 The Accidental Actress
 Vogue Arabia: Meet The First Saudi Actor to Land a Major Netflix Role

1980 births
Living people
Parsons School of Design alumni
New York Film Academy alumni
People from Jeddah
Saudi Arabian film actresses
People from Riyadh